The 1996 Miami Redskins football team was an American football team that represented Miami University in the Mid-American Conference (MAC) during the 1996 NCAA Division I-A football season. In its seventh season under head coach Randy Walker, Miami compiled a 6–5 record (6–2 against MAC opponents), finished in a tie for second place in the MAC, and outscored all opponents by a combined total of 273 to 168.

The team's statistical leaders included Sam Ricketts with 1,333 passing yards, Ty King with 1,065 rushing yards, and Tremayne Banks with 617 receiving yards.

Schedule

References

Miami
Miami RedHawks football seasons
Miami Redskins football